The Institute Id of Christ the Redeemer, Idente Missionaries, is a Catholic religious institute of consecrated life founded by Fernando Rielo in 1959 on the island of Tenerife, Spain. The congregation has religious men and women, as well as married missionaries.

History
The Idente Missionaries were founded on June 29, 1959 in the Diocese of Tenerife (Canary Islands, Spain), with the support of Bishop, Domingo Pérez Cáceres. The name is derived from a combination of the Spanish word "id" and the Latin "ente" to convey the idea of the "Great Commission" {Matt.28:19) "Go and teach all nations."

In January 1994, the missionaries were canonically recognized by the Archdiocese of Madrid as a Public Association of the Faithful. In 2009, Pope Benedict XVI elevated the Idente Missionaries to the status of a religious institute of consecrated life of pontifical right.

The Institute has some ninety houses in twenty countries.

Charism
The charism of the institute is a "filial consciousness" of God. This filial consciousness  consists in complete receptivity to grace. It is reflected in three principals:
 a vocation to holiness;
 community life; and
 a commitment to evangelization

Spirituality
The members of the Institute profess the religious vows of poverty, chastity, and obedience. There is a particular devotion to Mary, under the title "Our Lady of the Mystical Life", (honored with a chapel at Almudena Cathedral); and to St. Joseph.

Administration and Government 
Both the men's and the women's congregations of the Idente Missionaries each have a General Superior. The Apostolic President oversees both. The men's congregation has a Patriarch, responsible for the administration of each continent. The women's congregation has a Matriarch for administration of a continent. Provincial Superiors are responsible for administration in each Province. A province may have one or more delegations within it. A Superior administers each residence of the Idente Missionaries.

Ministry
In the Diocese of Novaliches (Philippines) the Institute runs the Holy Family residence for Senior Citizens.

Since 1994, the Idente Missionaries have administered the Parish of Santa Maria in the Bronx. In 2014, they assumed administration of the Parish of Our Lady of Loretto in Hempstead, NY.

Foundations 
The Idente Family is made up of lay people who share the spirit of the Institute, but do not profess vows.
The Idente School is a school for theological and philosophical studies. Its headquarters is in Rome, Italy. The Idente Youth is a foundation to promote idealism among youth. The Fernando Rielo Foundation publishes books and works of the Founder. It also encourages culture and poetry. Each year, since 1981, the Foundation awards the "Fernando Rielo World Prize for Mystical Poetry

See also 
 List of some religious institutes (Catholic)
 Institute of consecrated life

References

External links 
 Institute Id of Christ the Redeemer
 Section on the Consecrated Life in The Code of Canon Law, 1983
 Idente Youth - United States

Catholic lay organisations
Roman Catholic Diocese of San Cristóbal de La Laguna